University College of Teacher Education (UCTE) Vaikom is directly run by Mahatma Gandhi University, in Kottayam, Kerala, India. The college opened 1 September 1998. Communal reservation is strictly observed per Indian and Kerala government norms. About 30% of the students are low income and have their education expenses paid by the government.

The college courses include psychology, biology, language, computer science, social science, physical education room, and music towards Bachelor of Education in five disciplines: Social science, Life science, Malayalam, Commerce and physical science.

References

Colleges of education in India
Universities and colleges in Kottayam district
Colleges affiliated to Mahatma Gandhi University, Kerala
Educational institutions established in 1998
1998 establishments in Kerala
Vaikom